Phayao Provincial Administrative Organization Stadium or Phayao Province Stadium is a multi-purpose stadium in Phayao Province , Thailand.  It is currently used mostly for football matches and is the home stadium of Phayao F.C.  The stadium holds 2,406 people.

Football venues in Thailand
Multi-purpose stadiums in Thailand